Baiya Township was a former township in Jiange County, Guangyuan, Sichuan, China.

History 

Administrative divisions 
In 2019, Baiya Township administered the following eight administrative villages:

 Yunding Village
 Liuqing Village
 Xinmiao Village
 Jingquan Village
 Hongliang Village
 Gongtong Village
 Qingping Village
 Chengshan Village

Demographics 
As of 2018, Baiya Township had a population of 6,660, significantly higher than the 4,341 recorded in the 2010 Chinese Census. The latter figure represents a sizeable decline from the population of 6,967 recorded in the 2000 Chinese Census. This decline is likely due to, in part, the effects of the 2008 Sichuan Earthquake, which seriously affected Jiange County, as well as rural flight common throughout China.

See also 
 List of township-level divisions of Sichuan

References 

Township-level divisions of Sichuan
Jiange County
Former administrative divisions of China